In mathematics, a half range Fourier series is a Fourier series defined on an interval  instead of the more common , with the implication that the analyzed function  should be extended to  as either an even (f(-x)=f(x)) or odd function (f(-x)=-f(x)). This allows the expansion of the function in a series solely of sines (odd) or cosines (even).

Example

Calculate the half range Fourier sine series for the function  where .

Since we are calculating a sine series,
 
Now,

When n is odd,

When n is even,

thus

With the special case , hence the required Fourier sine series is

Fourier series